The following article presents a summary of the 2022–23 football (soccer) season in Bangladesh, which is the 51st season of competitive football in the country.

Bangladesh Premier League

The league will start on 9 December 2022 and end 22 July 2023.

Bashundhara Kings
Bangladesh Police FC
Chittagong Abahani
Dhaka Abahani
Dhaka Mohammedan
Muktijoddha Sangsad KC
Rahmatganj MFS
Saif SC
Sheikh Jamal Dhanmondi Club
Sheikh Russel KC
Fortis FC
AFC Uttara

Women's Football

The league will start on November 2022 and end March 2023.
.

Bangladesh Championship League

The league will start on 12 December 2022 and end 3 April 2023.

References

Football
Bangladesh
 
2022 in association football by country